The Middle Fork John Day River is a  tributary of the North Fork John Day River in the U.S. state of Oregon.

The Oregon Scenic Waterways Program, administered by the Oregon Parks and Recreation Department (OPRD), protects the river for most of its length. People planning to cut trees, mine, build roads or structures, or make other substantial changes within  of the river must first notify OPRD and seek its approval.

See also 
 List of rivers of Oregon
 List of longest streams of Oregon

References

External links

Rivers of Oregon
Rivers of Grant County, Oregon